Harold Cecil Train (October 15, 1887 – September 7, 1968) was a rear admiral in the United States Navy who served as the Director of the Office of Naval Intelligence between 1942 and 1943 and as commanding officer of the battleship . He was father of Admiral Harry D. Train II and grandfather of Rear Admiral Elizabeth L. Train.

Early life
Harold C. Train was born on October 15, 1887, in Kansas City, Missouri, the son of real estate dealer, Harry Depue (1860–1915) and Dora Elizabeth Langdon Train (1864–1916). He attended the local public schools Kansas City and subsequently entered the United States Naval Academy in Annapolis, Maryland.

Train graduated from the academy on June 4, 1909, with the rank of passed midshipman and was assigned to the armored cruiser . After two years of service at sea, then required by law, he was commissioned ensign on June 5, 1911.

In March 1912, Train was transferred to the armored cruiser . Aboard that ship, Train was appointed a company commander of the California Battalion ashore during the Revolution in Nicaragua. Train subsequently served aboard gunboat , operating in the Mexican waters. Then he spent several months as engineer officer aboard the ship USS Cheyenne.

World War II
Captain Train was appointed as commanding officer of the battleship  on February 3, 1940, and served in this capacity for one year. Then he became a chief of staff with Battle Force under the command of Vice Admiral William S. Pye.

During the Japanese Attack on Pearl Harbor, Train issued orders for the battleship  not to sortie, in order to minimize the damage of the ship and avert the possibility of the sinking and blocking the Pearl Harbor channel. For his conduct during the attack, Train was awarded the Navy Commendation Medal with Combat "V" from the commander of the Pacific Fleet, Admiral Chester W. Nimitz.

Train then spent almost three months as chief of staff with Admiral Nimitz' Pacific Fleet, before he was ordered to report to the Office of the Chief of Naval Operations, Admiral Ernest King. His next assignment was capacity of Director of the Office of Naval Intelligence, in which he replaced Rear Admiral Theodore S. Wilkinson on July 20, 1942. Train was promoted to the rank of rear admiral a month later.

In September 1943, Train was transferred to the Balboa, Panama, where he was appointed a commander of 15th Naval District, Panama Sea Frontier and Commander Southeast Pacific Force. In this capacity, he replaced Rear Admiral Clifford E. Van Hook and was responsible for the securing of the Panama Canal besides his other duties. For his service in this role, he was awarded the Legion of Merit by the army.

Train was relieved of that command on June 10, 1944 and transferred back to the United States for further assignment. He was subsequently assigned to the Joint Post-War Committee within Joint Chiefs of Staff in Washington, D.C. This work include diplomatic assignments with the United States delegation at Dumbarton Oaks Conference and to the United Nations organization and its first meetings in San Francisco.

After the Japanese surrender, Train remained on active duty as senior naval member of the Joint Post-War Committee until his retirement. He was decorated by the army with an oak leaf cluster to his Legion of Merit for the service with this committee.

Postwar life
Train retired from the navy on May 1, 1946, and subsequently accepted the capacity of superintendent of the Admiral Farragut Academy in St. Petersburg, Florida. After his second retirement, he lived with his wife in Bethesda, Maryland, where he died on September 7, 1968.

Train was survived by his wife May Philipps Train (1889–1980), daughters Marion, Harriett, Jane and son Harry D. Train II (future admiral in the United States Navy). He was also grandfather of Rear Admiral Elizabeth L. Train.

Decorations
Rear Admiral Harold C. Train's ribbon bar:

References

1887 births
1968 deaths
People from Kansas City, Missouri
United States Naval Academy alumni
United States Navy personnel of World War I
Naval War College alumni
United States Navy admirals
United States Navy World War II admirals
Directors of the Office of Naval Intelligence
Recipients of the Legion of Merit
Commanders of the Order of Polonia Restituta
Burials at the United States Naval Academy Cemetery